The William B. Graham Prize for Health Services Research is an award acknowledging contributions to health care research. It is funded by the Baxter International Foundation, and awarded every year through the US-based Association of University Programs in Health Administration (AUPHA). The recipient is awarded $25,000, with another $25,000 given to a non-profit institution selected by him or her.

Until 2005, the prize was named The Baxter International Foundation Prize for Health Services Research. It was renamed in 2006, after the death of long-time CEO of Baxter International, William B. Graham.

List of recipients

The Baxter International Foundation Prize
 1986: Avedis Donabedian
 1987: Brian Abel-Smith
 1988: Joseph Newhouse and Robert H. Brook
 1989: M. Eisenberg
 1990: Rosemary A. Stevens
 1991: Victor Fuchs
 1992: John D. Thompson and Robert B. Fetter
 1993: John Wennberg
 1994: Alain Enthoven
 1995: Stephen M. Shortell
 1996: Kerr L. White
 1997: David Mechanic
 1998: Harold S. Luft
 1999: Ronald Andersen and Odin W. Anderson
 2000: Karen Davis
 2001: Robert G. Evans
 2002: John M. Eisenberg (awarded posthumously)
 2003: (unknown)
 2004: Barbara Starfield
 2005: David Sackett

William B. Graham Prize
 2006: Linda Aiken
 2007: Donald Berwick
 2008: Michael Marmot
 2009: Carolyn Clancy
 2010: Uwe Reinhardt
 2011: Edward H. Wagner
 2012: Mark V. Pauly
 2013: Dorothy P. Rice
 2014: Stuart Altman
 2015: Anthony Culyer and Alan Maynard
 2016: John K. Iglehart
 2017:  David Blumenthal

See also

 List of medicine awards

References

External links
 The William B. Graham Prize for Health Services Research – Website of the Baxter International Foundation

Medicine awards
American science and technology awards
Baxter International